Pendle Hill High School is a comprehensive, co-educational high school with over 300 students located in Pendle Hill, a suburb in the west of Sydney, Australia. The school enjoys a prominent position in extensive, elevated and park-like grounds, with views east to Sydney and west to the Blue Mountains. Established in 1965, the school has a long tradition of academic, cultural and sporting achievements especially in rugby league.

School profile
The school is set in a residential area that is slowly undergoing renewal with increasing medium-density development, particularly around Pendle Hill railway station and Wentworthville railway station. The school is located close to Pendle Hill station.

There is increasing student cultural diversity with 40% of students coming from non-English speaking backgrounds. The school has a current teaching staffing establishment of over 30, many of whom have been teaching at the school for 10 years or more. Specialist staffing positions include vocational education coordinator, teacher librarian, learning support & welfare team, school counsellor, teachers aides and Aboriginal support staff. The executive consists of the Principal, Deputy Principal and Head Teachers.

Community involvement
The community takes pride in, and ownership of, the school. Active participation occurs through the Parents and Citizens Association, volunteer parents in the school canteen and participation of parents in recognition assemblies.

School grounds and facilities
The school, being over 40 years old, has been reasonably well maintained. The Multi-Purpose Centre and grounds are used for Recognition Assemblies and community sporting activities and are also widely used by many community groups. The school has recently refurbished and re-equipped three Computer Labs and two Science Labs. The school has also recently installed an elevator and built ramps in various locations around the school to enable disabled students to freely move around the school. The library has a computer lab and it is linked to the other computers in the school. Every computer is linked to the internet. The school has six Science Laboratories, eight Technological and Applied Science Rooms, three Visual Arts rooms, Photography Lab, a Music and Performing Arts Room, a School Fitness Centre and a Mathematics Task Centre. The Multi Purpose Centre is fully utilized and sporting facilities include gymnastics equipment, netball, tennis and basketball courts and two ovals.

Current direction
Pendle Hill High School is currently taking part in the Positive Behaviour for Learning (PBL) Program which aims to improve student learning and behaviour across the whole school. This program is based on the Positive Behavior in Schools (PBIS) program. The PBL program aims to improve structures within the school in order to improve discipline and learning. The focus of this program has resulted in the focus on "Responsibilities, Respect, Rights." This program has resulted in students being explicitly taught to have responsibility for their actions, respect for others and to be aware of both their rights and the rights of others. This process has resulted in improved student behavior through communicating expected behavior across the whole school to students, teachers, parents and the wider community. Part of this process has involved members of the school filming, editing and showing videos to students, staff and parents in order to inform all concerned parties of school expectations.

Notable alumni 
 Julian CheungHong Kong actor  
 Neil Huntrugby league footballer
 John Larkinauthor
 Scott Mahonrugby league footballer 
 Joan Rossartist; winner of the 2017 Sir John Sulman Prize

See also
 List of government schools in New South Wales
 Education in Australia

References

External links
 Pendle Hill High School website

Educational institutions established in 1965
Public high schools in Sydney
1965 establishments in Australia